Francis Fownes Luttrell (9 February 1756 – 24 April 1823) was a British politician who was a member of parliament for Minehead from 1780 to 1783. He was also a commissioner for Taxes and later for Customs, before serving as chair of the board of Customs from 1813 to 1819.

Personal life

Early life 
Fownes Luttrell was born on 9 February 1756, the third son of Henry Fownes Luttrell (né Fownes) and his wife, Margaret, the daughter and heiress of Alexander Luttrell of Dunster Castle. Henry Fownes added Luttrell to his surname on his marriage of Margaret Luttrell and became the proprietor or Dunster, as well as a number of other manors. He worked to consolidate his family's interest in the borough of Minehead, and, by 1774 effectively controlled both of that borough's seats in the House of Commons.

He was educated at Eton College, which he attended from 1771. He was admitted at Queen's College, Oxford, and matriculated in 1773. In 1782, he was admitted at the Middle Temple.

Family 
He married, on 21 April 1788, Charlotte, third daughter of Francis Drewe of Grange in Devon. They had five sons and seven daughters, of which several died young or unmarried: Louisa Frances (1794–1817), Francis (born 1795; died young), Maria (1796–1820), and Mary Frances (1798–1872), Francis Wynne (1801–1820), Edward (born 1803; died young) and Edward (born 1806; died young). Of the remainder:

Mrs Fownes Luttrell died on 27 April 1817.

Political career and later life 
By late 1774, the constituency of Minehead had fallen under the control of the Fownes Luttrell family of Dunster Castle. In 1780, Francis Fownes Luttrell was returned as the Member, in what one historian called a "stop gap". He voted with the Government in 1781, and for peace with America in 1782. He resigned his seat in 1783 in favour of Henry Beaufoy, who had paid him £3,000 for it. After his resignation, he was a Tax Commissioner from 1784 to 1793, and then moved to the Customs office, where he remained until 1819. He was created a DCL in 1793. He served as chairman of the board of Customs from 1813 to 1819, jointly with William Roe, and then retired from public office, being succeeded in that office by Richard Betenson Dean. He died on 24 April 1823.

Likenesses 
 Portrait of Francis Fownes Luttrell by Richard Phelps, chalk on paper, 1777, in the possession of the National Trust and housed at Dunster Castle, National Trust Collections, National Trust Inventory Number 726102.
 Portrait of an unknown gentleman, possibly Francis Fownes Luttrell, by Karl Anton Hickel, oil on canvas, 1793, in the possession of the National Trust and housed at Dunster Castle, BBC Your Paintings (see also National Trust Collections, National Trust Inventory Number 726117).

References

Citations

Bibliography 
 Crisp, F.A. (ed.) (1919). Visitation of England and Wales, volume 20.
 Lodge, E. (1859). The Peerage and Baronetage of the British Empire.
 Maxwell Lyte, Sir H.C. (1906). A History of Dunster. (Two volumes: one and two)
 Namier, Sir L. (1964a). "Fownes Luttrell, Francis (1756–1823)", The History of Parliament: the House of Commons 1754–1790, ed. Sir L. Namier, J. Brooke
 Namier, Sir L. (1964b). "Minehead", The History of Parliament: the House of Commons 1754–1790, ed. Sir L. Namier, J. Brooke

1756 births
1823 deaths
Luttrell family (of Dunster)
Alumni of The Queen's College, Oxford
Members of Lincoln's Inn
Members of the Parliament of Great Britain for English constituencies
British MPs 1780–1784
People educated at Eton College
English barristers